Kudelin Point (‘Nos Kudelin’ \'nos ku-de-'lin\) is the point on the northeast side of the entrance to Tlachene Cove on Loubet Coast, Antarctic Peninsula.  The point is formed by an offshoot of Gaydari Peak, and was shaped as a result of the retreat of Hopkins Glacier during the last two decades of the 20th century.

The feature is named after the settlement of Kudelin in Northwestern Bulgaria.

Location
British mapping in 1976.

Maps
 British Antarctic Territory.  Scale 1:200000 topographic map. DOS 610 Series, Sheet W 66 64.  Directorate of Overseas Surveys, Tolworth, UK, 1976.
 Antarctic Digital Database (ADD). Scale 1:250000 topographic map of Antarctica. Scientific Committee on Antarctic Research (SCAR). Since 1993, regularly upgraded and updated.

References
 Kudelin Point. SCAR Composite Antarctic Gazetteer.
 Bulgarian Antarctic Gazetteer. Antarctic Place-names Commission. (details in Bulgarian, basic data in English)

External links
 Kudelin Point. Copernix satellite image

Bulgaria and the Antarctic
Headlands of Graham Land
Loubet Coast